Île de Croÿ is a French island, part of the Kerguelen Islands and about ten miles north-west of the main island. It is located at 48°38'19.3"S 68°37'18.6"E.  It has no permanent inhabitants.

Land 
Île de Croÿ is 5.61 km from east to west. It has a volcano.

Climate 
The island is quite cold with an average of 9°C.

Plants and animals 
Living on the island are penguins, albatrosses, and seals. For more information, see List of mammals of French Southern Territories.

References 

Kerguelen Islands
Islands of the Atlantic Ocean
Uninhabited islands of France